Astey Ladies is a Bengali web series streaming on OTT platform hoichoi from 14 March 2019. Hoichoi also released the dubbed version of the web series named Salon De Paris. This Bengali drama series starring Sandipta Sen, Saayoni Ghosh and Indrasish Roy in the central characters.

Plot 
The story of Astey Ladies revolves around the lives of three women Megha, Tani & Lima whose lives depended on their beauty and styling parlour, Salon De Paris. Megha is a former school teacher and her husband does not believe in her dreams. Tani is a fighter – literally and figuratively – because of the cards life her dealt her. And Lima is a bundle of youthful energy and innocent charm. Together, they run the parlour, and there's nothing more important to them. But suddenly they face some financial issues that forced them to do something unthinkable – a jewellery heist!

Cast 
Sandipta Sen as Megha
Saayoni Ghosh as Tani 
Madhurima Ghosh as Lima
Saurav Das as Kaushik
Indrasish Roy as Subham
Dipankar De as Samar Poddar

Episodes

Season 1 (2019)
The Series started streaming from 14 March 2019 with nine episodes.

References

External links

Bengali-language web series
Hoichoi original programming